Anne of Denmark (12 December 1574 – 2 March 1619) was the wife of King James VI and I; as such, she was Queen of Scotland from their marriage on 20 August 1589 and Queen of England and Ireland from the union of the Scottish and English crowns on 24 March 1603 until her death in 1619.

The second daughter of King Frederick II of Denmark and Sophie of Mecklenburg-Güstrow, Anne married James at age 14. They had three children who survived infancy: Henry Frederick, Prince of Wales, who predeceased his parents; Princess Elizabeth, who became Queen of Bohemia; and James's future successor, Charles I. Anne demonstrated an independent streak and a willingness to use factional Scottish politics in her conflicts with James over the custody of Prince Henry and his treatment of her friend Beatrix Ruthven. Anne appears to have loved James at first, but the couple gradually drifted and eventually lived apart, though mutual respect and a degree of affection survived.

In England, Anne shifted her energies from factional politics to patronage of the arts and constructed her own magnificent court, hosting one of the richest cultural salons in Europe. After 1612, she had sustained bouts of ill health and gradually withdrew from the centre of court life. Though she was reported to have been a Protestant at the time of her death, she may have converted to Catholicism at some point in her life.

Some historians have dismissed Anne as a lightweight queen, frivolous and self-indulgent. However, 18th-century writers including Thomas Birch and William Guthrie considered her a woman of "boundless intrigue". Recent reappraisals acknowledge Anne's assertive independence and, in particular, her dynamic significance as a patron of the arts during the Jacobean age.

Early life
Anne was born on 12 December 1574 at the castle of Skanderborg on the Jutland Peninsula in the Kingdom of Denmark to Sophie of Mecklenburg-Güstrow and King Frederick II of Denmark. In need of a male heir the King had been hoping for a son, and Sophie gave birth to a son, Christian IV of Denmark, three years later.

With her older sister, Elizabeth, Anne was sent to be raised at Güstrow by her maternal grandparents, the Duke and Duchess of Mecklenburg. Christian was also sent to be brought up at Güstrow but two years later, in 1579, his father the King wrote to his parents-in-law, to request the return of his sons, Christian and Ulrich, (probably, at the urging of the Rigsråd, the Danish Privy Council), and Anne and Elizabeth returned with him.

Anne enjoyed a close, happy family upbringing in Denmark, thanks largely to Queen Sophie, who nursed the children through their illnesses herself. Suitors from all over Europe sought the hands of Anne and Elizabeth in marriage, including James VI of Scotland, who favoured Denmark as a kingdom reformed in religion and a profitable trading partner.

James's other serious possibility, though eight years his senior, was Catherine, sister of the Huguenot King Henry III of Navarre (future Henry IV of France), who was favoured by Elizabeth I of England. Scottish ambassadors in Denmark first concentrated their suit on the oldest daughter, but Frederick betrothed Elizabeth to Henry Julius, Duke of Brunswick, promising the Scots instead that "for the second [daughter] Anna, if the King did like her, he should have her."

Betrothal and proxy marriage

The constitutional position of Sophie, Anne's mother, became difficult after Frederick's death in 1588, when she found herself in a power struggle with the Rigsraad for control of her son King Christian. As a matchmaker, however, Sophie proved more diligent than Frederick and, overcoming sticking points on the amount of the dowry and the status of Orkney, she sealed the agreement by July 1589. Anne herself seems to have been thrilled with the match. On 28 July 1589, the English spy Thomas Fowler reported that Anne was "so far in love with the King's Majesty as it were death to her to have it broken off and hath made good proof divers ways of her affection which his Majestie is apt enough to requite." Fowler's insinuation, that James preferred men to women, would have been hidden from the fourteen-year-old Anne, who devotedly embroidered shirts for her fiancé while 300 tailors worked on her wedding dress.

Whatever the truth of the rumours, James required a royal match to preserve the Stuart line. "God is my witness", he explained, "I could have abstained longer than the weal of my country could have permitted, [had not] my long delay bred in the breasts of many a great jealousy of my inability, as if I were a barren stock." On 20 August 1589, Anne was married by proxy to James at Kronborg Castle, the ceremony ending with James's representative, George Keith, 5th Earl Marischal, sitting next to Anne on the bridal bed.

Marriage

Anne set sail for Scotland within 10 days, but her fleet under the command of Admiral Peder Munk was beset by a series of misadventures, finally being forced back to the coast of Norway, from where she travelled by land to Oslo for refuge, accompanied by the Earl Marischal and others of the Scottish and Danish embassies.

On 12 September, Lord Dingwall had landed at Leith, reporting that "he had come in company with the Queen's fleet three hundred miles, and was separated from them by a great storm: it was feared that the Queen was in danger upon the seas." Alarmed, James called for national fasting and public prayers, and kept watch on the Firth of Forth for Anne's arrival from Seton Palace, the home of his friend Lord Seton. He wrote several songs, one comparing the situation to the plight of Hero and Leander, and sent a search party out for Anne, carrying a letter he had written to her in French: "Only to one who knows me as well as his own reflection in a glass could I express, my dearest love, the fears which I have experienced because of the contrary winds and violent storms since you embarked ...". Anne's letters arrived in October explaining that she had abandoned the crossing. She wrote, in French; In what Willson calls "the one romantic episode of his life", James sailed from Leith with a three-hundred-strong retinue to fetch his wife personally. He arrived in Oslo on 19 November after travelling by land from Flekkefjord via Tønsberg. According to a Scottish account, he presented himself to Anne, "with boots and all", and, disarming her protests, gave her a kiss, in the Scottish fashion.

Anne and James were formally married in hall of the Old Bishop's Palace in Oslo, then the house of Christen Mule, on 23 November 1589, "with all the splendour possible at that time and place." So that both bride and groom could understand, Leith minister David Lindsay conducted the ceremony in French, describing Anne as "a Princess both godly and beautiful ... she giveth great contentment to his Majesty." A month of celebrations followed; and on 22 December, cutting his entourage to 50, James visited his new relations at Kronborg Castle in Elsinore, where the newlyweds were greeted by Queen Sophie, 12 year-old King Christian IV, and Christian's four regents. The couple moved on to Copenhagen on 7 March and attended the wedding of Anne's older sister Elizabeth to Henry Julius, Duke of Brunswick on 19 April, sailing two days later for Scotland in a patched up "Gideon". They arrived in the Water of Leith on 1 May. After a welcoming speech in French by James Elphinstone, Anne stayed in the King's Wark and James went alone to hear a sermon by Patrick Galloway in the Parish Church. Five days later, Anne made her state entry into Edinburgh in a solid silver coach brought over from Denmark, James riding alongside on horseback.

Coronation

Anne was crowned on 17 May 1590 in the Abbey Church at Holyrood, the first Protestant coronation in Scotland. During the seven-hour ceremony, her gown was opened by the Countess of Mar for presiding minister Robert Bruce to pour "a bonny quantity of oil" on "parts of her breast and arm", so anointing her as queen. (Kirk ministers had objected vehemently to this element of the ceremony as a pagan and Jewish ritual, but James insisted that it dated from the Old Testament.) The king handed the crown to Chancellor Maitland, who placed it on Anne's head. She then affirmed an oath to defend the true religion and worship of God and to "withstand and despise all papistical superstitions, and whatsoever ceremonies and rites contrary to the word of God".

Household in Scotland
Anne brought servants and courtiers from Denmark, including the ladies-in-waiting and chamberers Katrine Skinkel, Anna Kaas, and Margaret Vinstarr, the preacher Johannes Sering, a page William Belo, and artisans such as goldsmith Jacob Kroger, the carpenter Frederick, her cooks Hans Poppilman and Marion, and her tailors. Her Danish secretary Calixtus Schein had two Scottish colleagues, William Fowler and John Geddie. The head of her first household was Wilhelm von der Wense. Servants from her home country provided familiarity and bridged a cultural divide.

At first, observers like William Dundas thought the queen led a solitary life, with few Scottish companions. Later in 1590 more Scottish noblewomen were appointed to serve her, including Marie Stewart, a daughter of Esmé Stewart, 1st Duke of Lennox, Margaret Wood, and members of the Ochiltree Stewart family. James invited Scottish lairds including Robert Mure of Caldwell to send gifts of hackney horses for the queen's ladies to ride. Anne bought her ladies and maidens of honour matching clothes and riding outfits, made by her Danish tailor Pål Rei and furrier Henrie Koss, and the Scottish tailors Peter Sanderson and Peter Rannald supervised by her master of Wardrobe, Søren Johnson. She had an African servant, noted in the accounts only as the "Moir", who was probably a "page of the equerry", attending her horse. He was dressed in orange velvet and Spanish taffeta. When he died at Falkland Palace in July 1591, James paid for his funeral.

Two Danish favourites, Katrine Skinkel and Sofie Kass wore velvet hats with feathers to match the queen's, made by an older gentlewoman in the household, Elizabeth Gibb, the wife of the king's tutor Peter Young. Anne gave her ladies wedding gowns and trousseaux when they married, and even arranged a loan for the dowry of Jean, Lady Kennedy. When, in December 1592 the widower John Erskine, Earl of Mar married Marie Stewart, James VI and Anne of Denmark attended the celebrations at Alloa and there was a masque in costume in which Anne of Denmark performed. From 1594, the German physician Martin Schöner attended her when she was ill or in childbed. Her court musician in Scotland was John Norlie an English lutenist.

In 1593, Anne told the English ambassador Robert Bowes that she would like to meet Queen Elizabeth, and wanted to have a young English gentleman or maiden of "good parentage" join her household. Bowes passed this request to Cecil to consider. She made another ouverture of friendship to Elizabeth I in May 1595, asking for her portrait. There was no response and Bowes had to reiterate her request. Finally, in February 1596 Elizabeth condescended to grant Anne's "earnest desire" and send her a picture.

Relationship with James

By all accounts, James was at first entranced by his bride, but his infatuation evaporated quickly and the couple often found themselves at loggerheads, though in the early years of their marriage James seems always to have treated Anne with patience and affection. James Melville of Halhill, a gentleman of her bedchamber, wrote that in Scotland Anne would intercede with James on behalf of honest courtiers, if she heard that he was stirred up against them by "wrong information" or slander.

In their first years of marriage, James VI and Anne of Denmark personally dressed in costume and took part in masques at the weddings of courtiers. These performances typically involved music, dance, and disguise. Between 1593 and 1595, James was romantically linked with Anne Murray, later Lady Glamis. He addressed her in verse as "my mistress and my love". Anne of Denmark herself was also occasionally the subject of scandalous rumours. In the Basilikon Doron, written 1597–1598, James described marriage as "the greatest earthly felicitie or miserie, that can come to a man".

From the first moment of the marriage, Anne was under pressure to provide James and Scotland with an heir, but the passing of 1591 and 1592 with no sign of a pregnancy provoked renewed Presbyterian libels on the theme of James's fondness for male company and whispers against Anne "for that she proves not with child". When it was thought that she was pregnant, James tried to prevent her going horseriding but she refused. There was great public relief when on 19 February 1594 Anne gave birth to her first child, Henry Frederick.

Custody of Prince Henry

Anne soon learned that she would have no say in her son's care. James appointed as head of the nursery his former nurse Helen Little, who installed Henry in James's own oak cradle. Most distressingly for Anne, James insisted on placing Prince Henry in the custody of John Erskine, Earl of Mar at Stirling Castle, in keeping with Scottish royal tradition.

In late 1594, she began a furious campaign for custody of Henry, recruiting a faction of supporters to her cause, including the chancellor, John Maitland of Thirlestane. Nervous of the lengths to which Anne might go, James formally charged Mar in writing never to surrender Henry to anyone except on orders from his own mouth, "because in the surety of my son consists my surety", nor to yield Henry to the Queen even in the event of his own death. Anne demanded the matter be referred to the Council, but James would not hear of it. After public scenes in which James reduced her to rage and tears over the issue, Anne became so bitterly upset that in July 1595 she suffered a miscarriage. Thereafter, she outwardly abandoned her campaign, but it was thought permanent damage had been done to the marriage. In August 1595, John Colville wrote: "There is nothing but lurking hatred disguised with cunning dissimulation betwixt the King and the Queen, each intending by slight to overcome the other." Despite these differences, Anne and James visited the Prince at Stirling in December 1595 and returned to Holyrood Palace to celebrate her 21st birthday. They had six more children. Anne extended and rebuilt Dunfermline Palace, in 1601 preparing a lodging for her daughter Princess Elizabeth, but the princess remained at Linlithgow Palace on the king's orders. Her younger sons Charles and Robert were allowed to stay with her at Dunfermline and Dalkeith Palace.

In February 1603, the French ambassador in London, Christophe de Harlay, Count of Beaumont, reported a rumour spread by James's friends that Anne was cruel and ambitious, hoping to rule Scotland as Regent or Governor for her son after her husband's death. Anne saw a belated opportunity to gain custody of Henry in 1603 when James left for London with the Earl of Mar to assume the English throne following the death of Elizabeth I. Pregnant at the time, Anne descended on Stirling with a force of "well-supported" nobles, intent on removing the nine-year-old Henry, whom she had hardly seen for five years; but Mar's wife and his young son would allow her to bring no more than two attendants with her into the castle. The obduracy of Henry's keepers sent Anne into such a fury that she suffered another miscarriage: according to David Calderwood, she "went to bed in anger and parted with child the tenth of May."

When the Earl of Mar returned with James's instructions that Anne join him in the Kingdom of England, she informed James by letter that she refused to do so unless allowed custody of Henry. This "forceful maternal action", as historian Pauline Croft describes it, obliged James to climb down at last, though he reproved Anne for "froward womanly apprehensions" and described her behaviour in a letter to Mar as "wilfulness".

James wrote to Anne that he had not received accusations from Mar's supporters that her actions at Stirling were motivated by religious factionalism or "Spanish courses". He reminded her that she was "a king's daughter" but "whether ye a king's or a cook's daughter, ye must be must be all alike to me, being once my wife", and so she should have respected the confidence he, her husband, had placed in Mar. The French ambassador in London, Maximilien de Béthune, Duke of Sully, heard that Anne would bring and exhibit her embalmed still-born male child in England in order to dispel false rumours about a plot.

Stirling to Windsor Castle

After a brief convalescence from the miscarriage, Anne travelled from Stirling to Edinburgh, where several English ladies had gathered, hoping to join her court, including Lucy, Countess of Bedford and Frances Howard, Countess of Kildare. Anne ordered a new gown of figured taffeta and had her white satin gown refashioned. New clothes were bought for her entourage, and her jester Tom Durie was given a green coat.

Marmaduke Darrell was sent from London with money for the expenses of her journey and the group of ladies sent by the Privy Council to attend her. Anne duly travelled south with Prince Henry, their progress causing a sensation in England. Princess Elizabeth followed two days later and soon caught up, but Prince Charles was left at Dunfermline, being sickly.

She was met at York on 11 June by Thomas Cecil, Lord Burghley. He wrote to Sir Robert Cecil, "she will prove, if I be not deceived, a magnifical prince, a kind wife and a constant mistress". Her large crowd of followers was disorderly and there were quarrels between the Earl of Argyll and the Earl of Sussex, and between Thomas Somerset and William Murray who argued about the role of Master of Horse. The Duke of Lennox and the Earls of Shrewsbury and Cumberland made a proclamation at Worksop Manor that her followers should put aside any private quarrels, and hangers-on without formal roles should leave.

Courtiers and gentry made efforts to meet her on her journey.Lady Anne Clifford recorded that she and her mother killed three horses in their haste to see the Queen at Dingley. In the great hall at Windsor Castle, "there was such an infinite number of lords and ladies and so great a Court as I think I shall never see the like again."

Anne and James were crowned at Westminster Abbey on 25 July 1603. The coronation prayers for Anne alluded to Esther, the Wise Virgins, and other Biblical heroines.

An English estate and income for the Queen
A council was appointed in 1593 by the Parliament of Scotland to look after her landed estates and income. At the end of December 1595, the Queen's council, re-appointed as a financial administration known as the Octavians, gave Anne of Denmark a purse of gold which she then presented to the king as a New Year's Day gift.

Anne's financial position changed in England when she was awarded a new jointure estate based on lands, manors, and parks which had previously been given to Catherine of Aragon. Administrators, led by Sir Robert Cecil, were appointed in November 1603, while the court was at Wilton House. The yearly income would be £6,376 according to a summary sent by King James to Anne's brother Christian IV for approval in December 1603. Anne wrote to Christian IV, pleased by the comparison with Catherine of Aragon, who was also a king's daughter. The estate included Somerset House, the Honour of Hatfield, Pontefract Castle, Nonsuch Palace, and the old palace at Havering-atte-Bower. Robert Cecil had considered other royal dowries, including those of Cecily of York, Mary Tudor, and Mary of France. Thomas Edmondes heard the settlement was "as much, or rather more, than has been granted to any former King's wife".

The English jointure income was to be spent on Anne's clothes and her household wages and rewards. King James would pay the other costs of her household, stable, and food. The Venetian diplomat Scaramelli heard she had received a gift of valuable jewels from James, Nonsuch Palace, and a yearly income of 40,000 crowns. If she became a widow she would be independent of her son, Prince Henry. An advisory committee was appointed to manage the property and income in England. Anne would continue to draw an income from her Scottish jointure properties. A similar commission for her Scottish properties had been appointed in April 1603 under the leadership of Alexander Seton, Lord Fyvie. Henry Wardlaw of Pitreavie was chamberlain of the Scottish lands, comprising the Lordship of Dunfermline, the Earldom of Ross, and Lordships of Ardmannoch and Etrrick Forest, and compiled accounts of the queen's revenue.

On 13 February 1610, John Chamberlain wrote that Anne "hath been somewhat melancholy of late about her jointure, that was not fully to her liking" and King James had promised additional funds. In the autumn of 1617, King James changed the settlement, giving Anne an additional £20,000, to make £50,0000 yearly, from which she would pay for her household diet and stable if he died before her.

Marital frictions
Observers regularly noted incidents of marital discord between Anne and James. The so-called Gowrie conspiracy of 1600, in which the young Earl of Gowrie, John Ruthven, and his brother Alexander Ruthven were killed by James's attendants for a supposed assault on the King, triggered the dismissal of their sisters Beatrix and Barbara Ruthven as ladies-in-waiting to Anne, with whom they were "in chiefest credit." The Queen, who was five months pregnant, refused to get out of bed unless they were reinstated and stayed there for two days, also refusing to eat. When James tried to command her, she warned him to take care how he treated her because she was not the Earl of Gowrie. James placated her for the moment by paying a famous acrobat to entertain her, but she never gave up, and her stubborn support for the Ruthvens over the next three years was taken seriously enough by the government to be regarded as a security issue. In 1602, after discovering that Anne had smuggled Beatrix Ruthven into Holyrood, James carried out a cross-examination of the entire household; in 1603, he finally decided to grant Beatrix Ruthven a pension of £200.

In 1603, James fought with Anne over the proposed composition of her English household, sending her a message that "his Majesty took her continued perversity very heinously." In turn, Anne took exception to James's drinking: in 1604 she confided to the French ambassador Beaumont that "the King drinks so much, and conducts himself so ill in every respect, that I expect an early and evil result."

A briefer confrontation occurred in 1613 when Anne shot and killed James's favourite dog during a hunting session at Theobalds. After his initial rage, James smoothed things over by giving her a £2,000 diamond in memory of the dog, whose name was Jewel.

Separate life

Anne enjoyed living in London, while James preferred to escape the capital, most often at his hunting lodge in Royston. Anne's chaplain, Godfrey Goodman, later summed up the royal relationship: "The King himself was a very chaste man, and there was little in the Queen to make him uxorious; yet they did love as well as man and wife could do, not conversing together." Anne moved into Greenwich Palace and then Somerset House, which she renamed Denmark House. After 1607, she and James rarely lived together, by which time she had borne seven children and suffered at least three miscarriages. After narrowly surviving the birth and death of her last baby, Sophia, in 1607, Anne's decision to have no more children may have widened the gulf between her and James.

A funeral and a wedding 

The death of their son Henry in November 1612 at the age of eighteen, probably from typhoid and the departure of their daughter Elizabeth further weakened the family ties binding Anne and James. Henry's death hit Anne particularly hard; the Venetian ambassador Foscarini was advised not to offer condolences to her "because she cannot bear to have it mentioned; nor does she ever recall it without abundant tears and sighs".

At first, Anne had objected to her daughter's match with Frederick V of the Palatinate, regarding it as beneath the royal family's dignity. She did not come to a betrothal ceremony at Whitehall, due to an attack with gout. However, she had warmed to Frederick, and attended the wedding itself on 14 February 1613. She was saddened by the tournaments on the following day, which reminded her of Henry. The couple left England for Heidelberg in April. From this time forward, Anne's health deteriorated, and she withdrew from the centre of cultural and political activities, staging her last known masque in 1614, and no longer maintaining a royal court. Her influence over James visibly waned as he became openly dependent on powerful favourites.

Reaction to favourites
Although James had always adopted male favourites among his courtiers, he now encouraged them to play a role in the government. Anne reacted very differently to the two powerful favourites who dominated the second half of her husband's English reign, Robert Carr, Earl of Somerset, and George Villiers, the future Duke of Buckingham. She detested Carr, but she encouraged the rise of Villiers, whom James knighted in her bedchamber; and she developed friendly relations with him, calling him her "dog". Even so, Anne found herself increasingly ignored after Buckingham's rise and became a lonely figure towards the end of her life.

Religion

A further source of difference between Anne and James was the issue of religion; for example, she abstained from the Anglican communion at her English coronation. Anne had been brought up a Lutheran, and had a Lutheran chaplain Hans Sering in her household, but she may have discreetly converted to Catholicism at some point, a politically embarrassing scenario which alarmed ministers of the Scottish Kirk and caused suspicion in Anglican England.

Queen Elizabeth had certainly been worried about the possibility and sent messages to Anne warning her not to listen to papist counsellors and requesting the names of anyone who had tried to convert her; Anne had replied that there was no need to name names because any such efforts had failed. Anne drew criticism from the Kirk for keeping Henrietta Gordon, wife of the exiled Catholic George Gordon, 1st Marquess of Huntly, as a confidante; after Huntly's return in 1596, the St Andrews minister David Black called Anne an atheist and remarked in a sermon that "the Queen of Scotland was a woman for whom, for fashion's sake, the clergy might pray but from whom no good could be hoped."

When former intelligencer Sir Anthony Standen was discovered bringing Anne a rosary from Pope Clement VIII in 1603, James imprisoned him in the Tower for ten months. Anne protested her annoyance at the gift, but eventually secured Standen's release.

Like James, Anne later supported a Catholic match for both their sons, and her correspondence with the potential bride, the Spanish Infanta, Maria Anna, included a request that two friars be sent to Jerusalem to pray for her and the King. The papacy itself was never quite sure where Anne stood; in 1612, Pope Paul V advised a nuncio: "Not considering the inconstancy of that Queen and the many changes she had made in religious matters and that even if it might be true that she might be a Catholic, one should not take on oneself any judgement."

Court and politics

In Scotland, Anne sometimes exploited court factionalism for her own ends, in particular by supporting the enemies of the Earl of Mar. As a result, James did not trust her with secrets of state. Henry Howard, active in the highly secret diplomacy concerning the English succession, subtly reminded James that though Anne possessed every virtue, Eve was corrupted by the serpent. Another of James's secret correspondents, Robert Cecil, believed that "the Queen was weak and a tool in the hands of clever and unscrupulous persons." In practice, Anne seems to have been little interested in high politics unless they touched on the fate of her children or friends, and later told Secretary of State Robert Cecil that "she was more contented with her pictures than he with his great employments." However, in November 1600 Robert Cecil had been anxious to find out about correspondence she had with Archduke Albert, Governor of the Spanish Netherlands.

In England, Anne largely turned from political to social and artistic activities. Though she participated fully in the life of James's court and maintained a court of her own, often attracting those not welcomed by James, she rarely took political sides against her husband. Whatever her private difficulties with James, she proved a diplomatic asset to him in England, conducting herself with discretion and graciousness in public. Anne played a crucial role, for example, in conveying to ambassadors and foreign visitors the prestige of the Stuart dynasty and its Danish connections.

The Venetian envoy, Nicolò Molin, wrote this description of Anne in 1606: 

Anne's comments did attract attention and were reported by diplomats. In May 1612 the Duke of Bouillon came to London as the ambassador of Marie de' Medici, dowager of France. According to the Venetian ambassador, Antonio Foscarini, his instructions included a proposal of marriage between Princess Christine, the second Princess of France, and Prince Henry. Anne told one of his senior companions that she would prefer Prince Henry married a French princess without a dowry than a Florentine princess with any amount of gold.

Reputation
Anne has traditionally been regarded with condescension by historians, who have emphasised her triviality and extravagance. Along with James, she tended to be dismissed by a historical tradition, beginning with the anti-Stuart historians of the mid-17th century, which saw in the self-indulgence and vanity of the Jacobean court the origins of the English civil war. Historian David Harris Willson, in his 1956 biography of James, delivered this damning verdict: "Anne had little influence over her husband. She could not share his intellectual interests, and she confirmed the foolish contempt with which he regarded women. Alas! The king had married a stupid wife." The 19th-century biographer Agnes Strickland condemned Anne's actions to regain custody of Prince Henry as irresponsible: "It must lower the character of Anne of Denmark in the eyes of everyone, both as a woman and queen, that she ... preferred to indulge the mere instincts of maternity at the risk of involving her husband, her infant, and their kingdom, in the strife and misery of unnatural warfare."

However, the reassessment of James in the past two decades, as an able ruler who extended royal power in Scotland and preserved his kingdoms from war throughout his reign, has been accompanied by a re-evaluation of Anne as an influential political figure and assertive mother, at least for as long as the royal marriage remained a reality. John Leeds Barroll argues in his cultural biography of Anne that her political interventions in Scotland were more significant, and certainly more troublesome, than previously noticed; and Clare McManus, among other cultural historians, has highlighted Anne's influential role in the Jacobean cultural flowering, not only as a patron of writers and artists but as a performer herself.

Patron of the arts
Anne shared with James the fault of extravagance, though it took her several years to exhaust her considerable dowry. She loved dancing and pageants, activities often frowned upon in Presbyterian Scotland, but for which she found a vibrant outlet in Jacobean London, where she created a "rich and hospitable" cultural climate at the royal court, became an enthusiastic playgoer, and sponsored lavish masques. Sir Walter Cope, asked by Robert Cecil to select a play for the Queen during her brother Ulrik of Holstein's visit, wrote, "Burbage is come and says there is no new play the Queen has not seen but they have revived an old one called Love's Labour's Lost which for wit and mirth he says will please her exceedingly." Anne's masques, scaling unprecedented heights of dramatic staging and spectacle, were avidly attended by foreign ambassadors and dignitaries and functioned as a potent demonstration of the English crown's European significance. Zorzi Giustinian, the Venetian ambassador, wrote of the Christmas 1604 masque that "in everyone's opinion no other Court could have displayed such pomp and riches".

Anne's masques were responsible for almost all the courtly female performance in the first two decades of the 17th-century and are regarded as crucial to the history of women's performance. Anne sometimes performed with her ladies in the masques herself, occasionally offending members of the audience. In The Vision of the Twelve Goddesses of 1604, she played Pallas Athena, wearing a tunic that some observers regarded as too short; in The Masque of Blackness of 1605, Anne performed while six months pregnant, she and her ladies causing scandal by appearing with their skin painted as "blackamores". Letter writer Dudley Carleton reported that when the Queen afterwards danced with the Spanish ambassador, he kissed her hand "though there was danger it would have left a mark upon his lips". Anne commissioned the leading talents of the day to create these masques, including Ben Jonson and Inigo Jones.

Jones, a gifted architect steeped in the latest European taste, also designed the Queen's House at Greenwich for Anne, one of the first true Palladian buildings in England. He designed ornamental gateways for her gardens and vineyard at Oatlands. The Sergeant Painter John de Critz decorated a fireplace in her "tiring chamber", her dressing room at Somerset House with various colours of marbling and imitation stone, and painted black and white marble in the chapel at Oatlands. In 1618 a passage at Somerset House was decorated with Renaissance style grotesque work, recorded as "crotesque".

The diplomat Ralph Winwood obtained special greyhounds for her hunting from Jacob van den Eynde, Governor of Woerden. The Dutch inventor Salomon de Caus laid out her gardens at Greenwich and Somerset House. She had a barge for her journeys on the Thames, with glass windows. Anne particularly loved music and patronised the lutenist and composer John Dowland, previously employed at her brother's court in Denmark, as well as "more than a good many" French musicians. Between 1607 and her death in 1619 she also employed the Irish harper Daniel Duff O'Cahill.

Anne also commissioned artists such as Paul van Somer, Isaac Oliver, and Daniel Mytens, who led English taste in visual arts for a generation. Under Anne, the Royal Collection began once more to expand, a policy continued by Anne's son, Charles. With some irony, Anne's servant Jean Drummond compared the queen's reputation to be content among "harmless pictures in a paltry gallery" with the Earl of Salisbury's "great employments in fair rooms". Drummond's remark contrasts the smaller and more private spaces housing the queen's collection with the halls and presence chambers where statecraft was enacted.

She was involved in an unsuccessful attempt to found a college or university at Ripon in Yorkshire in 1604. The scheme was promoted by Cecily Sandys, the widow of the Bishop Edwin Sandys and other supporters including Bess of Hardwick and Gilbert Talbot, 7th Earl of Shrewsbury. Historian Alan Stewart suggests that many of the phenomena now seen as peculiarly Jacobean can be identified more closely with Anne's patronage than with James, who "fell asleep during some of England's most celebrated plays".

Later years and illness

The royal physician Sir Theodore de Mayerne left extensive Latin notes describing his treatment of Anne of Denmark from 10 April 1612 to her death.
From September 1614 Anne was troubled by pain in her feet, as described in the letters of her chamberlain Viscount Lisle and the countesses of Bedford and Roxburghe. Lisle first noted "the Queen hath been a little lame" as early as October 1611. She was ill in March 1615, suspected to have dropsy. In August an attack of gout forced her to stay an extra week in Bath, her second visit to the spa town for its medicinal waters.

Although she danced at a Christmas masque, said to be "a good sign of her convalescence", in January 1616 she moved from Whitehall Palace to Somerset House suffering from gout. King James planned to visit Scotland, and it was said that she dreamed of ruling England as regent in his absence. The Earl of Dunfermline noted in February that "her majesty looks very well, but yet I think is not perfectly well, she infrequently dresses, and keeps her bedchamber and a solitary life most times." James went to Scotland, while Anne stayed at Greenwich Palace and moved to Oatlands in June. She was well enough to go hunting in August 1617. By late 1617, Anne's bouts of illness had become debilitating; the letter writer John Chamberlain recorded: "The Queen continues still ill disposed and though she would fain lay all her infirmities upon the gout yet most of her physicians fear a further inconvenience of an ill habit or disposition through her whole body."

In December 1617 the Venetian ambassador Piero Contarini had to wait a few days to get an audience with her because of illness. He described her appearance at Somerset House. She was seated under a canopy of gold brocade. Her costume was pink and gold, low cut at the front in an oval shape, and her farthingale was four feet wide. Her hair was dressed with diamonds and other jewels and extended in rays, or like the petals of a sunflower, with artificial hair. She had two little dogs who barked at the ambassador. Contarini had a second audience with Anne in December and was led through private corridors in the palace by a richly dressed lady in waiting carrying a candle.

On 9 April 1618 she was well enough to make a shopping trip incognito to the Royal Exchange, and was discovered, drawing a crowd of onlookers. She had a nosebleed at Oatlands in September 1618 that confined her to bed and disrupted her travel plans. Lucy, Countess of Bedford, thought it had weakened her, and she appeared "dangerously ill". In November, a comet was interpreted as a portent of her death, but she was reported to be in good health and had watched a fox hunt from her bedroom window.

Death and funeral
Anne moved to Hampton Court and was attended by Mayerne and Henry Atkins.  In January 1619 Mayerne instructed Anne to saw wood to improve her blood flow, but the exertion served to make her worse. Mayerne attributed the queen's ill-health to her cold and northerly upbringing, and wrote in his notes that as a child she had been carried around by her nurses until the age of nine, rather than allowed to walk.

James visited Anne only three times during her last illness, though their son Charles often slept in the adjoining bedroom at Hampton Court Palace and was at her bedside during her last hours, when she had lost her sight. With her until the end was her personal maid, Anna Kaas, who had arrived with her from Denmark in 1590. Queen Anne died aged 44 on 2 March 1619, of dropsy.

Despite his neglect of Anne, James was emotionally affected by her death. He did not visit her during her dying days or attend her funeral, being himself sick, the symptoms, according to Sir Theodore de Mayerne, including "fainting, sighing, dread, incredible sadness ...". The inquest discovered Anne to be "much wasted within, specially her liver". After a prolonged delay, she was buried in King Henry's Chapel, Westminster Abbey, on 13 May 1619.

The catafalque placed over her grave, designed by Maximilian Colt, was destroyed during the civil war. Inigo Jones had provided an alternative design for the catalfaque with more complex sculptural symbolism than Colt's.

As he had done before he ever met her, King James turned to verse to pay his respects:

Lionel Cranfield, as Master of Great Wardrobe, spent £20,000 on the funeral. After the funeral, her French servant Piero Hugon, and Anna, a Danish maiden of honour, were arrested and accused of stealing jewels worth £30,000. Another servant, Margaret Hartsyde, had faced similar charges a decade earlier.

Issue

Anne gave birth to seven children who survived beyond childbirth, four of whom died in infancy or early childhood. She also suffered at least three miscarriages. The physician Martin Schöner attended her pregnancies. Her second son succeeded James as King Charles I. Her daughter Elizabeth was the "Winter Queen" of Bohemia and the grandmother of King George I of Great Britain.

 Henry Frederick, Prince of Wales (19 February 1594 – 6 November 1612). Died, probably of typhoid fever, aged 18.
 miscarriage (July 1595).
 Elizabeth, Queen of Bohemia (19 August 1596 – 13 February 1662). Married 1613, Frederick V, Elector Palatine. Died aged 65.
 Margaret (24 December 1598 Dalkeith Palace – March 1600 Linlithgow Palace). Died aged fifteen months. Buried at Holyrood Abbey.
 Charles I, King of England, Scotland and Ireland (19 November 1600 – 30 January 1649). Married 1625, Henrietta Maria of France. Executed aged 48.
 Robert, Duke of Kintyre (18 January 1602 – 27 May 1602). Died aged four months.
 miscarriage (10 May 1603).
 Mary (8 April 1605 Greenwich Palace – 16 December 1607 Stanwell, Surrey). Died aged two.
 Sophia (22 June 1606 – 23 June 1606). Born and died at Greenwich Palace.

Ancestry

See also
 Cape Ann, Massachusetts
 Sign of Hertoghe
 Letter from Anna of Denmark to the Duke of Buckingham, Folger Shakespeare Library.

References

Further reading 

 
 Akrigg, G.P.V ([1962] 1978 edition). Jacobean Pageant: or the Court of King James I. New York: Athenaeum; .
 Ackroyd, Peter (2006). Shakespeare: The Biography. London: Vintage; .
 Ayres, Sara (2020). 'A Mirror for the Prince: Anne of Denmark in Hunting Costume', JHNA 12:2
 Barroll, J. Leeds (2001). Anna of Denmark, Queen of England: A Cultural Biography. Philadelphia: University of Pennsylvania; .
 Cerasano, Susan, and Marion Wynne-Davies (1996). Renaissance Drama by Women: Texts and Documents. London and New York: Routledge; .
 Croft, Pauline (2003). King James. Basingstoke and New York: Palgrave Macmillan; .
 Field, Jemma, (2020). Anna of Denmark: The Material and Visual Culture of the Stuart Courts, 1589-1619. Manchester University Press; .
 Fraser, Lady Antonia ([1996] 1997 edition). The Gunpowder Plot: Terror and Faith in 1605. London: Mandarin Paperbacks; .
 Haynes, Alan ([1994] 2005 edition). The Gunpowder Plot. Stroud: Sutton Publishing; .
 Hogge, Alice (2005). God's Secret Agents: Queen Elizabeth's Forbidden Priests and the Hatching of the Gunpowder Plot. London: Harper Collins; .
 McCrea, Scott (2005). The Case For Shakespeare: The End of the Authorship Question. Westport, Connecticut: Praeger/Greenwood; .
 McManus, Clare (2002). Women on the Renaissance Stage: Anna of Denmark and Female Masquing in the Stuart Court (1590–1619). Manchester: Manchester University Press; .
 Sharpe, Kevin (1996). "Stuart Monarchy and Political Culture", in The Oxford Illustrated History of Tudor & Stuart Britain (ed. John S. Morrill). Oxford: Oxford University Press; .
 Stevenson, David (1997). Scotland's Last Royal Wedding: James VI and Anne of Denmark. Edinburgh, John Donald; .
 Stewart, Alan (2003). The Cradle King: A Life of James VI & 1. London: Chatto and Windus; .
 Strickland, Agnes (1848). Lives of the Queens of England: From the Norman Conquest. Vol VII. Philadelphia: Lea and Blanchard. Original from Stanford University, digitised 20 April 2006.  Full view at Internet Archive.; retrieved 10 May 2007.
 Williams, Ethel Carleton (1970). Anne of Denmark. London: Longman; .
 Willson, David Harris ([1956] 1963 edition). King James VI & 1. London: Jonathan Cape Ltd; .
 

|-

|-

 
1574 births
1619 deaths
16th-century Danish people
16th-century Norwegian people
16th-century Scottish people
17th-century Danish people
17th-century Norwegian people
17th-century Scottish people
17th-century philanthropists
Burials at Westminster Abbey
Danish philanthropists
Danish princesses
Deaths from edema
English women philanthropists
English royal consorts
Irish royal consorts
James VI and I
Norwegian philanthropists
Norwegian princesses
Danish patrons of the arts
Norwegian patrons of the arts
Scottish patrons of the arts
English patrons of the arts
People from Skanderborg Municipality
Scottish philanthropists
Scottish royal consorts
Danish expatriates in England
16th-century Danish women
16th-century English women
16th-century Norwegian women
17th-century Danish women
17th-century English women
17th-century Norwegian women
16th-century Scottish women
17th-century Scottish women
Danish women philanthropists
Children of Frederick II of Denmark
Daughters of kings